Ting-Xing Ye (born 1952) is a Chinese- Canadian author of young adult novels, as well as Leaf In A Bitter Wind, a best-selling autobiographical account of her life in Maoist China.

Biography
Ye was born in Shanghai, China, in 1952, the fourth of five children. Her parents were a factory owner and his wife. Ye's parents died when she was a small child, leaving Ye and her four siblings in the care of her Great-Aunt. During the Cultural Revolution, Ye and her family were condemned as having "bad blood" and persecuted by the Communist regime, because their father had been a boss in a factory. At sixteen, like millions of other young Chinese men and women, Ye was exiled to a prison farm to "learn from the peasants" and be "reformed" by hard labor. On the farm, Ye was persecuted and suffered torture at the hands of her leaders.

Ye spent six years laboring on the prison farm, before being admitted to Beijing University. She took a degree in English Literature, then began a seven-year career as English interpreter for the national government in Shanghai. During that time she met her future husband, Canadian writer and educator William E. Bell who taught English at the Foreign Affairs College in Beijing. Ye came to Canada in 1987. She published her autobiography, detailing her life in Mao's China, in 1997. She published her first picture book in 1998. Ye also writes Young Adult fiction and non-fiction.

Selected works
 Leaf In A Bitter Wind, autobiographical memoir, 1997
 Three Monks, No Water, illustrated by Harvey Chan, 1997
 Weighing The Elephant, illustrated by Suzanne Langlois, 1998
 Share The Sky, illustrated by Suzanne Langlois, 1999
 White Lily, a chapter book, 2000
 Throwaway Daughter, a Young Adult novel, 2003
 My Name is Number Four, Young Adult non-fiction, 2007
 Mountain Girl, River Girl, a Young Adult novel, 2008

See also

 Scar literature
 Cultural Revolution
 Jung Chang

External links 
  (Ting-Xing Ye and William Bell)
 

1952 births
Living people
People from Orillia
Chinese women writers
Canadian children's writers
Writers from Shanghai
Canadian writers of Asian descent
Canadian women children's writers